Alobras is a municipality located in the province of Teruel, Aragon, Spain. According to the 2004 census (INE), the municipality has a population of 85 inhabitants.

References

External links
 Official Website

Municipalities in the Province of Teruel